San Andrés Itzapa is a town, with a population of 24,992 (2018 census), and a municipality of Chimaltenango, Guatemala.  San Andrés Itzapa is in the eastern region of Chimaltenango, while the district capital lies to the north, Acatenango lies to the south and to the east is Parramos. The municipality cover an area of 63.7 km2, with a total population of 32,083.

Origin of the name
San Andrés Itzapa (Itzapa means flint) is an ancient town. The village is mentioned in the Annals of the Cakchiquels, written in 1571. The Spanish named the area "Itzapa y de San Andrés" in honor of their patron saint, the apostle San Andrés (Saint Andrew). The Spanish also called the area "Valle del Durazno" (Valley of the peaches), as the prickly pears common in this area resembled the orchards of home.

Organization

Languages
Both Spanish and Kaqchiquel are spoken, although migration from other regions has brought an influx of other languages, such as Kʼicheʼ and Tzʼutujil.

Flora and fauna

San Andrés Itzapa has several heavily forested areas, which include eucalyptus, poplars, pines, holly, oaks, cypress and other evergreen and deciduous species.

Plants found in San Andrés Itzapa include canaque, casuarina, conacaste, hormigo, grabilea and palo blanco, as well as varieties of aloe.

Animals include coyote, armadillos, mountain lions, tisote, lynxes, goyoy, kinkajou, squirrels, racoons, wild boars, dove, cayayes, pajuil, and pheasant.

Agricultural products
Wheat, cotton, corn, beans, avocado, chayote, beet, radish, squash, carrot, broccoli, cabbage, coffee and guaque Chile peppers are grown.

Crafts
The municipality is rich in the craftsmanship of leather goods such as knife and machete sheaths, sandals, articles of jade, tables and chairs, ropemaking, and others.

Celebrations

 Convite (the last Saturday of January) 
 Feria Titular (from  22 November to 1 December) 
 Corpus Christi (late June)
 Corrida de Cintas (15 September)
 Maximón (28 October)
 Saint Andrew the Apostle (30 November)

Places of interest
 Xipacay bath 
 Temple of San Simón

Volunteer Organizations
DOCARE Clinic - An American non-profit medical outreach program operated by the American Osteopathic Association.  This clinic was established in 2011 in conjunction with Guatemalan non-profit ASSADE, employs a full-time physician and nurse, and regularly hosts medical students and physician trainees from American programs as volunteer medical providers.
Maya Pedal - small local NGO dedicated to supporting rural development through the design and production of pedal powered machines, or bicimaquinas. As of September 2012, Maya Pedal recently underwent an organizational change, please refer to the website or Facebook page for more information.
Project Genesis- Local nonprofit that provides education and community development programs to the children of San Andrés and the surrounding villages. It aims to build a school and begin employing full-time teachers. The project currently relies on international volunteers, and was founded by Ricardo Armas who lives in Jocotenango.

Climate

San Andrés Itzapa has a subtropical highland climate (Köppen: Cwb).

Geographic location

San Andrés Itzapa is surrounded by Chimaltenango Department municipalities:

See also

 
 List of places in Guatemala

Notes and references

References

Municipalities of the Chimaltenango Department